Robert Fagg or Fagge may refer to:

Sir Robert Fagge, 2nd Baronet (c. 1649–1715)
Sir Robert Fagge, 3rd Baronet (1673–1736)
Sir Robert Fagge, 4th Baronet of the Fagge baronets